Arlette Merry (18 March 1918 – 19 February 2015) was a French actress and singer. She was the daughter of Lucien Pinoteau and the sister of Claude Pinoteau and Jacques Pinoteau.

Merry died in February 2015 at the age of 96.

Filmography

References

Bibliography
 Rège, Philippe. Encyclopedia of French Film Directors, Volume 1. Scarecrow Press, 2009.

External links

1918 births
2015 deaths
French film actresses
Actresses from Paris
20th-century French actresses